The Kawanishi E15K Shiun (紫雲, "Violet Cloud") was a single-engined Japanese reconnaissance floatplane of World War II. The Allied reporting name for the type was "Norm" after Squadron Leader Norman O. Clappison of the RAAF, a member of the Allied Technical Air Intelligence Unit (ATAIU).

Design and development
In 1939 the Imperial Japanese Navy instructed the Kawanishi Aircraft Company to develop a two-seat high-speed reconnaissance floatplane, which was required to have sufficient performance to escape interception by land based fighters as well as an 800-nautical mile range. It was planned to equip a new class of cruisers, intended to act as a flagship for groups of submarines, operating six of the new floatplanes to find targets. The first of the new cruisers, Ōyodo was also ordered in 1939.

Kawanishi designed a single-engined low-wing monoplane, powered by a 1,460 hp (1,090 kW) Mitsubishi MK4D Kasei 14 14-cylinder radial driving two contra-rotating two-bladed propellers, the first installation of contra-rotating propellers produced in Japan, while a laminar flow airfoil section was chosen to reduce drag. It had a single main float under the fuselage and two stabilizing floats under the wing. The stabilizing floats were designed to retract into the wing, while the central float was designed to be jettisoned in case of emergency, giving a sufficient increase in speed (estimated as approximately 50 knots (90 km/h)) to escape enemy fighters.

The first prototype of Kawanishi's design, designated E15K1 in the Navy's short designation system made its maiden flight on 5 December 1941. Five more prototypes followed during 1941–42. Development became protracted due to the E15K1's advanced features, and the project fell behind schedule. Problems were encountered with the retractable stabilizing floats, resulting in several accidents when the floats could not be lowered for landing, and the system was eventually abandoned, with the stabilizing floats being fixed, and a more powerful Mitsubishi MK4S Kasei 24 engine fitted to compensate for the increased drag.

Operational history
Despite these problems, the E15K1 was ordered into limited production as the Navy Type 2 High-speed Reconnaissance Seaplane Shiun Model 11.  Six prototype and service trial E15Ks were built and evaluated from 1941 to 1942. Production finally got underway in 1943, but the first operational E15K1s did not enter service until April 30, 1944, when six were assigned to the 12th Reconnaissance Squadron of the 61st Air Flotilla.

On June 1 the first of its Shiuns arrived at Palau Island in the South Pacific. By that time new Allied fighters of much higher performance, specifically the Grumman F6F Hellcat, had entered service.  Compounding Japanese crews' undoubted frustration, when under attack, the Shiun's main float jettison mechanism — which had been wind-tunnel tested, but never tried on an actual airplane prior to manufacture — failed to work in combat.  Coupled with high maintenance and other mechanical issues, further production was cancelled in February 1944, with only 15 Shiuns completed, including the six prototypes.

Variants
 E15K1 : Single-engined reconnaissance floatplane. Production version.

Operators

 Imperial Japanese Navy Air Service

Specifications (E15K1 late production)

See also

Notes

Bibliography

External links

E15K, Kawanishi
Floatplanes
E15
Single-engined tractor aircraft
Low-wing aircraft
Aircraft first flown in 1941